Alevtina Pavlovna Kolchina ( alternate spelling: Alevtina Koltsjina; 11 November 1930 – 1 March 2022) was a Soviet cross-country skier who competed during the 1950s and 1960s for Burevestnik and later for Dynamo sports societies. She competed in four Winter Olympics, earning a total of five medals. Kolchina also competed several times at the Holmenkollen ski festival, winning three times at 10 km (1961–1963) and once at 5 km (1966).

Personal life and death
Kolchina was born in the village of Pavlovsk, Ochyorsky District, Perm Oblast, and took up skiing at the age of 13. She was married to four-time Olympic cross country medalist Pavel Kolchin until his death in 2010. In 1973, the family moved to Otepää, where Kolchins worked as national cross-country ski coaches, functionaries and consultants. Their son Fjodor Koltšin placed 15th in the Nordic combined at the 1980 Winter Olympics, competing for the Soviet Union (Estonia restored its independence in 1991.).

Kolchina died on 1 March 2022, at the age of 91.

Career
Kolchina's biggest success was at the FIS Nordic World Ski Championships, where she won three medals in 10 km (golds in 1958 and 1962, silver in 1966), three medals in the 3×5 km relay (golds in 1958, 1962, and 1966), and two medals in 5 km (golds in 1962 and 1966). Kolchina also was Soviet champion in women's cross country skiing thirteen times in her career.

For her successes in the world championships and at the Holmenkollen, Kolchina received the Holmenkollen medal in 1963 (shared with her husband, Astrid Sandvik, and Torbjørn Yggeseth). Kolchina is the third woman, first Soviet/Russian, and first female Nordic skier to ever win the Holmenkollen medal. Kolchina and her husband are the first husband and wife team to ever win the Holmenkollen Medal.

Cross-country skiing results
All results are sourced from the International Ski Federation (FIS).

Olympic Games
 Five medals – (one gold, one silver, three bronze)

World Championships
 8 medals – (7 gold, 1 silver)

References

External links
 
 
 Holmenkollen medalists – click Holmenkollmedaljen for downloadable pdf file 
 Holmenkollen winners since 1892 – click Vinnere for downloadable pdf file 

1930 births
2022 deaths
Sportspeople from Perm Krai
Russian female cross-country skiers
Soviet female cross-country skiers
Burevestnik (sports society) athletes
Cross-country skiers at the 1956 Winter Olympics
Cross-country skiers at the 1960 Winter Olympics
Cross-country skiers at the 1964 Winter Olympics
Cross-country skiers at the 1968 Winter Olympics
Dynamo sports society athletes
Holmenkollen medalists
Holmenkollen Ski Festival winners
Olympic cross-country skiers of the Soviet Union
Olympic gold medalists for the Soviet Union
Olympic silver medalists for the Soviet Union
Olympic bronze medalists for the Soviet Union
Olympic medalists in cross-country skiing
FIS Nordic World Ski Championships medalists in cross-country skiing
Medalists at the 1956 Winter Olympics
Medalists at the 1964 Winter Olympics
Medalists at the 1968 Winter Olympics